Moussa Bandeh Kandeh (born 2 August 1991), simply known as Moussa, is a Spanish footballer who plays for CF Badalona as a left back.

Club career
Born in Badalona, Barcelona, Catalonia, Moussa graduated with CE L'Hospitalet's youth setup, and was promoted to the main squad in July 2010. He made his senior debut on 26 September, starting in a 0–0 away draw against UD Alzira in the Segunda División B.

On 8 July 2014, Moussa moved to UE Olot, also in the third level. On 12 March of the following year, after being an undisputed starter for the side, he renewed his contract for a further year.

On 5 July 2015, Moussa signed a two-year deal with neighbouring Gimnàstic de Tarragona, newly promoted to the Segunda División. He made his professional debut on 5 September, starting in a 1–0 home win against Girona FC.

On 18 January 2016, after being rarely used, Moussa returned to his previous club Olot, on loan until June. On 16 July he moved to CF Badalona, a club he already represented as a youth, again in a temporary deal.

On 23 June 2017, Moussa signed a two-year deal with Lleida Esportiu.

References

External links

1991 births
Living people
People from Mataró
Sportspeople from the Province of Barcelona
Spanish people of Gambian descent
Spanish sportspeople of African descent
Spanish footballers
Footballers from Catalonia
Association football defenders
Segunda División players
Segunda División B players
CE L'Hospitalet players
UE Olot players
Gimnàstic de Tarragona footballers
CF Badalona players
Lleida Esportiu footballers
CF Damm players